The Visualization Handbook is a textbook by Charles D. Hansen and Christopher R. Johnson that serves as a survey of the field of scientific visualization by presenting the basic concepts and algorithms in addition to a current review of visualization research topics and tools. It is commonly used as a textbook for scientific visualization graduate courses. It is also commonly cited as a reference for scientific visualization and computer graphics in published papers, with almost 500 citations documented on Google Scholar.

Table of Contents
PART I - Introduction
Overview of Visualization - William J. Schroeder and Kenneth M. Martin
PART II - Scalar Field Visualization: Isosurfaces
Accelerated Isosurface Extraction Approaches -Yarden Livnat
Time-Dependent Isosurface Extraction - Han-Wei Shen
Optimal Isosurface Extraction - Paolo Cignoni, Claudio Montani, Robert Scopigno, and Enrico Puppo
Isosurface Extraction Using Extrema Graphs - Takayuki Itoh and Koji Koyamada
Isosurfaces and Level-Sets - Ross Whitaker
PART III - Scalar Field Visualization: Volume Rendering
Overview of Volume Rendering - Arie E. Kaufman and Klaus Mueller
Volume Rendering Using Splatting - Roger Crawfis, Daqing Xue, and Caixia Zhang
Multidimensional Transfer Functions for Volume Rendering - Joe Kniss, Gordon Kindlmann, and Charles D. Hansen
Pre-Integrated Volume Rendering - Martin Kraus and Thomas Ertl
Hardware-Accelerated Volume Rendering - Hanspeter Pfister
PART IV - Vector Field Visualization
Overview of Flow Visualization - Daniel Weiskopf and Gordon Erlebacher
Flow Textures: High-Resolution Flow Visualization - Gordon Erlebacher, Bruno Jobard, and Daniel Weiskopf
Detection and Visualization of Vortices - Ming Jiang, Raghu Machiraju, and David Thompson
PART V - Tensor Field Visualization 
Oriented Tensor Reconstruction - Leonid Zhukov and Alan H. Barr
Diffusion Tensor MRI Visualization - Song Zhang, David Laidlaw, and Gordon Kindlmann
Topological Methods for Flow Visualization - Gerik Scheuermann and Xavier Tricoche
PART VI - Geometric Modeling for Visualization
3D Mesh Compression - Jarek Rossignac
Variational Modeling Methods for Visualization - Hans Hagen and Ingrid Hotz
Model Simplification - Jonathan D. Cohen and Dinesh Manocha
PART VII - Virtual Environments for Visualization 
Direct Manipulation in Virtual Reality - Steve Bryson
The Visual Haptic Workbench - Milan Ikits and J. Dean Brederson
Virtual Geographic Information Systems - William Ribarsky
Visualization Using Virtual Reality - R. Bowen Loftin, Jim X. Chen, and Larry Rosenblum
PART VIII - Large-Scale Data Visualization
Desktop Delivery: Access to Large Datasets - Philip D. Heermann and Constantine Pavlakos
Techniques for Visualizing Time-Varying Volume Data - Kwan-Liu Ma and Eric B. Lum
Large-Scale Data Visualization and Rendering: A Problem-Driven Approach - Patrick McCormick and James Ahrens
Issues and Architectures in Large-Scale Data Visualization - Constantine Pavlakos and Philip D. Heermann
Consuming Network Bandwidth with Visapult - Wes Bethel and John Shalf
PART IX - Visualization Software and Frameworks
The Visualization Toolkit - William J. Schroeder and Kenneth M. Martin
Visualization in the SCIRun Problem-Solving Environment - David M. Weinstein, Steven Parker, Jenny Simpson, Kurt Zimmerman, and Greg M. Jones
Numerical Algorithms Group IRIS Explorer - Jeremy Walton
AVS and AVS/Express - Jean M. Favre and Mario Valle
Vis5D, Cave5D, and VisAD - Bill Hibbard
Visualization with AVS - W. T. Hewitt, Nigel W. John, Matthew D. Cooper, K. Yien Kwok, George W. Leaver, Joanna M. Leng, Paul G. Lever, Mary J. McDerby, James S. Perrin, Mark Riding, I. Ari Sadarjoen, Tobias M. Schiebeck, and Colin C. Venters
ParaView: An End-User Tool for Large-Data Visualization - James Ahrens, Berk Geveci, and Charles Law
The Insight Toolkit: An Open-Source Initiative in Data Segmentation and Registration - Terry S. Yoo
amira: A Highly Interactive System for Visual Data Analysis - Detlev Stalling, Malte Westerhoff, and Hans-Christian Hege 
PART X - Perceptual Issues in Visualization 
Extending Visualization to Perceptualization: The Importance of Perception in Effective Communication of Information - David S. Ebert
Art and Science in Visualization - Victoria Interrante
Exploiting Human Visual Perception in Visualization - Alan Chalmers and Kirsten Cater
PART XI - Selected Topics and Applications
Scalable Network Visualization - Stephen G. Eick
Visual Data-Mining Techniques - Daniel A. Keim, Mike Sips, and Mihael Ankerst
Visualization in Weather and Climate Research - Don Middleton, Tim Scheitlin, and Bob Wilhelmson
Painting and Visualization - Robert M. Kirby, Daniel F. Keefe, and David Laidlaw
Visualization and Natural Control Systems for Microscopy - Russell M. Taylor II, David Borland, Frederick P. Brooks, Jr., Mike Falvo, Kevin Jeffay, Gail Jones, David Marshburn, Stergios J. Papadakis, Lu-Chang Qin, Adam Seeger, F. Donelson Smith, Dianne Sonnenwald, Richard Superfine, Sean Washburn, Chris Weigle, Mary Whitton, Leandra Vicci, Martin Guthold, Tom Hudson, Philip Williams, and Warren Robinett
Visualization for Computational Accelerator Physics - Kwan-Liu Ma, Greg Schussman, and Brett Wilson

See also
 Numerical Recipes
Computer Graphics: Principles and Practice

References

Computer science books
Engineering textbooks
Elsevier books
Computer graphics
2005 non-fiction books